Cymindis ghazniensis is a species of ground beetle in the subfamily Harpalinae. It was described by Jedlicka in 1967.

References

ghazniensis
Beetles described in 1967